Walter Joseph Patrick Curley Jr. (September 17, 1922 – June 2, 2016) was the 57th United States Ambassador to France from 1989 to 1993, and the United States Ambassador to Ireland from 1975 to 1977. Curley was New York City's Commissioner of Public Events and Chief of Protocol from 1973 to 1974, during the administrations of John Lindsay and Abraham Beame.

Career
He wrote two books on royalty, Vanishing Kingdoms, and Monarchs in Waiting, as well as two memoirs, Letters from the Pacific: 1943–1946, and Almost a Century: An American Life East and West of Suez. Curley was a graduate of Phillips Academy, Yale University and Harvard Business School. Curley was in the Marine Corps during World War II, serving from 1943 to 1946, seeing combat on Iwo Jima and Okinawa. He was a captain and was decorated with a Bronze star. Curley died in New York City.

His nomination as United States Ambassador to France was controversial as he was one of several made by Bush of long-time financial backers and financial supporters including Peter F. Secchia (Ambassador of Italy), Joseph Zappala (Ambassador of Spain), Mel Sembler (Ambassador of Australia), Frederic Bush Morris (Ambassador of Luxembourg), and Joy Silverman (Ambassador of Barbados).

Works

References

External links

 Walter J. P. Curley Papers (MS 2009). Manuscripts and Archives. Yale University Library. 

1922 births
2016 deaths
Writers from Pittsburgh
Writers from New York City
Yale University alumni
Ambassadors of the United States to France
Ambassadors of the United States to Ireland
American male writers
Harvard Business School alumni
Phillips Academy alumni
United States Marine Corps officers
United States Marine Corps personnel of World War II